"All by Myself" is a 1975 song by Eric Carmen.

All by Myself may also refer to:

Albums 
 All by Myself (Eddie Kendricks album), 1971 on the Tamla imprint of Motown Records
 All by Myself (Regina Belle album), 1987
 All by Myself (Rikk Agnew album)
 All by Myself (Shirley Bassey album)

Songs 
 "All by Myself" (Irving Berlin song), 1921
 "All by Myself" (Bee Gees song), 1966
 "All by Myself", a 1941 song by Big Bill Broonzy

 Re-recorded by Fats Domino on Rock and Rollin' with Fats Domino, 1956
 "All by Myself", a song by Green Day from Dookie, 1994
 "All by Myself", a song by Ringo Starr from Goodnight Vienna, 1974
 "All by Myself", a song by Alok, Sigala and Ellie Goulding, 2022

Other media 
 All by Myself (film), a 1943 American comedy film
 "All by Myself" (Grey's Anatomy), an episode of the TV series Grey's Anatomy
 "All by Myself", an episode of the TV series 7th Heaven
 All by Myself, a 1983 Little Critter book by Mercer Mayer
 All by Myself: The Eartha Kitt Story, a 1982 documentary film

See also 
 By Myself (disambiguation)